Silene sessionis is a species of plant in the family Caryophyllaceae.

It is native to Algeria. Where it is endemic to coastal sea cliffs.

The IUCN lists the species as endangered.

References 

sessionis
Flora of Algeria
IUCN Red List endangered species